Cyril Hall  (14 December 1889 – 20 March 1979) was a former Australian rules footballer who played with Melbourne in the Victorian Football League (VFL).

Notes

External links 
	
	
Demonwiki profile

1889 births
Australian rules footballers from Victoria (Australia)
Melbourne Football Club players
1979 deaths